Steven Brooks (born 1984) is a professional lacrosse player that retired  from the Atlas LC (PLL) of Premier Lacrosse League in 2019. Brooks was the 6th overall draft pick in the 2008 Major League Lacrosse Collegiate Draft by the Chicago Machine. He played high school lacrosse for Libertyville High School in Libertyville, Illinois. He also attended a postgraduate year at Bridgton Academy.  Brooks played college lacrosse at Syracuse University. In January 2020, Brooks was named assistant coach of the Atlas LC (PLL) in the professional lacrosse league PLL. He is the first ever PLL player turned coach in the league's history.

College career 
Brooks played college lacrosse at Syracuse University from 2003 to 2008.  He won two Division I National Championships while with the Syracuse Orange men's lacrosse, in 2004 and 2008. In 2008 Brooks was selected as a first-team All-American during his senior season and also won the McLaughlin Award as the nation's best midfielder. He ended his college career with a total of 67 Goals, 34 Assists, and 86 Ground Balls totaling 101 points.

Professional career 
2008: Chicago Machine; Brooks was drafted 6th overall by the Chicago Machine in the 2008 MLL Collegiate Draft. Brooks had a break out rookie season. He played in 15 games for the Machine recording 29 goals, 4 two-pointers, and 11 assists totaling 44 points, and adding 26 ground balls. He was named to the 2008 MLL All-Star team. He also competed in the 2008 Bud Light Skills fastest shot competition.

2009: Chicago Machine; 5 games into the 2009 season and his second season with the Machine he broke his foot against Boston. This injury sideline Brooks for the rest of the season.

2010: In 2010 Brooks played for the LXM Pro Tour league for Team STX.

2011: Chesapeake Bayhawks; Brooks was traded to the Bayhawks in February 2011. He played in 12 games for the Bayhawks, recording 11 goals, 2 two-pointers, and 5 assists totaling 18 points, and adding 8 ground balls. He was the Bud Light MVP for their game against Hamilton.

2012: Chesapeake Bayhawks; In 2012 he was a key player recording 23 goals, 3 two-pointers, 10 assists, and 11 ground balls. He was the Bud Light MVP for their game against Denver. In playoffs he totaled another 2 goals and 4 assists helping the Bayhawks to win their 4th MLL Championship Title. He was named to the 2012 MLL All-Star team. Brooks stuck the game-winning goal in the All-Star game to lead his Old School Team to victory. He also competed in the 2012 Bud Light Skills fastest shot competition.

2013: Chesapeake Bayhawks; In 2013 Brooks recorded 13 goals, 1 two-pointer, 8 assists, and 10 ground balls. In playoffs he totaled 1 goal and 2 ground balls. With 3 minutes to go in the semi-final championship game, Brooks stuck a goal to tie the game at 12, the Bayhawks then scored with 1 min to go to advance to the Championship game and win their 5th MLL Championship Title. Brooks was named to the 2013 MLL All-Star team and he also competed in the 2013 Bud Light Skills fastest shot competition at the All-Star game.

2014: Chesapeake Bayhawks; In 2014 Brooks recorded 6 goals, 1 two-pointer, 3 assists, and 3 ground balls. Brooks struggled with a knee injury throughout the season. He was traded to Florida Launch for the last four games of the season.

2014: Florida Launch; Brooks was traded to the Launch in July 2014 and played in four games. He had a standout performance totaling 10 goals, 1 two-pointer, 4 assists, and 2 ground balls. He scored two goals, including a two-point goal, and one assist against Denver (7/20) tallied three goals, two assists, and one groundball against Boston (7/26), three goals and an assist at Boston (8/2), and two goals at Ohio (8/9).

2015: Florida Launch; Brooks had a milestone year tallying his most goals in a season and hitting his 100th goal. Brooks played in 13 games for the Launch, recording a point in each contest. Tallied one assist and four groundballs at Chesapeake (4/19). Paced the Launch in the home opener versus Chesapeake (4/26) with a season-high four goals. Recorded two goals and two assists at Rochester (5/3) for a team-high four points with two groundballs. Provided a pair of goals in the first win of 2015 against Ohio (5/9). Eclipsed 100 career points on the road at Ohio with his first of three goals in the contest (5/24). Scored a goal and collected a groundball on the road at Boston (5/30). Logged a goal and assist on the road at New York (6/5). Scooped up a season-high four groundballs with three goals versus New York and made ESPN's Sports Center Top 10 plays at #8 with his goal from a behind the back pass from Casey Powell.(6/26). Scored first Launch goal versus Charlotte (7/3), ending the night with three scores and a groundball. Set a career-high for goals in a season with 24 versus Rochester (7/25), recording two goals and an assist for three points in the game.

2016: Florida Launch; Brooks played in 13 games for the Launch scoring a point in three out of the four contests. Logged two goals and a season high four groundballs in the home opener against Ohio (4/16). Scored a goal and accounted for one assist at Chesapeake (4/30). Recorded two points and three groundballs versus Charlotte (5/14).  Tallied one assist and one groundball against Atlanta (5/21).  Scored a goal and recorded an assist against Ohio (6/4).  Recorded an assist against Denver (6/11). Scored a goal against Denver (7/4). Had a season high three points against the Lizards (7/14). Scored a goal against Charlotte (7/22). Scored a goal and an assist against Atlanta (7/23). Scored on a two-point shot along with three groundballs at home versus Rochester (7/30).  Goal and assist in season finale at Boston (8/6).

2017: Florida Launch; Brooks was named Captain for 2017 season leading the Launch to their first ever play-off debut. Brooks began the season opener against the Boston Cannons on (4/23) with one goal. Tallied one assist on (4/29) against Rochester. Scored a goal against the Denver Outlaws on (5/13). Scored one goal and his first two-point goal of the season against the Rochester Rattlers (5/20). (6/17) against Atlanta, Brooks added one assist. (6/24) Brooks recorded his 100th game played in the MLL against Charlotte adding a goal in the win. (7/15) Brooks then scored a hat trick against the Chesapeake Bayhawks. Brooks recorded one ground ball and a goal in the game on (7/20) against Chesapeake, then scored another goal on the (7/22) game against Charlotte two days later. Scored two goals and tallied two assists accumulating to four points on the (7/29) game against Boston. Brooks led the Launch to their first ever play-off berth to the semi-finals.

2018: Florida Launch; Second season as Captain of the Florida Launch. Brooks started his 2018 campaign against Atlanta scoring one goal and picking up one ground ball. On 4/28 Brooks tallied three assists and two ground balls. On 5/10 against Boston, Brooks recorded one goal and picked up one ground ball. One 6/2 Brooks scooped up two ground balls against the Boston Cannons. At New York on 6/09, Brooks had one goal and one ground ball. Brooks tallied one goal and had one ground ball against Denver 6/16. On 7/7 vs Ohio Brooks recorded one goal. Brooks recorded one goal against Ohio to assist in the 13–12 win on 7/26. In the last two games of the season, Brooks scored one goal in each. In the 2018 season, Brooks recorded 11 points and picked up 10 ground balls after playing in every game for the Launch. Steven Brooks was named the Launch nominee for the MLL Dave Huntley Man of the Year Award at the 2018 MLL Honors.

2019: Atlas LC (PLL); Brooks played in the first ever season of the PLL as a member of the Atlas Lacrosse Club before announcing his retirement on September 24, 2019.

Coaching career 
In January 2020, Brooks was named assistant coach of the Atlas LC (PLL) in the professional lacrosse league PLL. He is the first ever PLL player turned coach in the league's history. On October 21, 2023, he was named the interim head coach with the resignation of Ben Rubeor.

In 2014, Brooks was named offensive coordinator of St. Paul VI High School (Fairfax, VA) varsity lacrosse team. In 2018, he helped lead the team to win their first ever Virginia Independent Schools Athletic Association (VISAA) Division I Boys' Lacrosse State Championship.

Awards and achievements
As Player:
2002 High School All-American.
2002 Illinois Lacrosse Player of the Year
2004 NCAA Men's Lacrosse Championship Winner (Syracuse Orange)
2008 USILA First Team All-American
2008 won the McLaughlin Award as the nation's top midfielder.
2008 NCAA Men's Lacrosse Championship Winner (Syracuse Orange)
2008 Major League Lacrosse All-Star
2012 Major League Lacrosse All-Star
2012 Major League Lacrosse Steinfeld Cup Champion (Chesapeake Bayhawks)
2013 Major League Lacrosse All-Star
2013 Major League Lacrosse Steinfeld Cup Champion (Chesapeake Bayhawks)
As Coach:
2018 VISAA Division I Boys' Varsity Lacrosse State Championship - St. Paul VI High School (Offensive Coordinator)

Statistics

NCAA

Major League Lacrosse

Premier League Lacrosse

References

1984 births
Living people
Chesapeake Bayhawks players
Sportspeople from Lake Forest, Illinois
Syracuse Orange men's lacrosse players
Lacrosse players from Illinois
Bridgton Academy alumni
Florida Launch players
Premier Lacrosse League players